Richard P. "Rick" Cheek (born October 4, 1977) is an American kickboxer and mixed martial artist who competes in the heavyweight division. A North American Muay Thai champion as an amateur, Cheek turned professional in 2005 and debuted in K-1 the same year. He holds notable wins over WSOF standout Dave Huckaba in MMA, 2001 K-1 Japan Grand Prix Champion Nicholas Pettas and multiple time world kickboxing champion Mike Sheppard.

Career
Cheek was the United States Air Force boxing champion and started training in kickboxing and Muay Thai in 2000 at the age of twenty-three. In August 2004, he competed in a four-man tournament held over two days in Orlando, Florida to determine the IKF Amateur North American Super Heavyweight (+106.8 kg/235 lb) Muay Thai Champion. After defeating Bernard Settle, Jr. by technical knockout in round two of their semi-final bout, he outpointed Brian Wells to a unanimous decision in the final to take the crown. He followed this up with the IKF's Amateur California Muay Thai title when he stopped Ben Davis with low kicks in round one in Fairfield, California on March 26, 2005.

After turning professional, Cheek made his K-1 debut on August 13, 2005, in a tournament reserve bout at the K-1 World Grand Prix 2005 in Las Vegas II against Mike Sheppard, knocking him out in the second round. He was absent from both K-1 Las Vegas events in 2006 due to a torn ACL and MCL he sustained in February 2006.

After a year out of the ring, Cheek returned on August 11, 2007, for the K-1 World Grand Prix 2007 in Las Vegas tournament. He stopped Imani Lee with a barrage of unanswered punches in round three in the quarter-finals but was unable to continue in the tournament due to a leg injury and was replaced by Doug Viney, who eventually went on to win the title.

In early 2008, Cheek fought for the Miami Force in the World Combat League and, on June 20, 2008, faced Patrice Quarteron for the vacant IKF World Super Heavyweight (+106.8 kg/235 lb) Muay Thai title in Montego Bay, Jamaica. He was sent to the canvas early with a flurry of punches and elbows. After beating the count, he was dropped with a low kick, which also caused Quarteron to fall over. As both fighters fell to the canvas, Quarteron's knee landed on Cheek's head, seemingly knocking him unconscious.

He soon made his way back to K-1 to fight in the K-1 World Grand Prix 2008 in Hawaii in Honolulu on August 9, 2008. He won by TKO against Kyokushin karate stylist Nicholas Pettas in the quarter-finals when Pettas aggravated a groin injury sustained in training early in the fight. He was then eliminated by the eventual tournament winner Gökhan Saki in the semis. He was floored with low kicks before being crumpled with a liver punch towards the end of round one.

In his second attempt at a world title, he challenged Ben Edwards for the vacant ISKA World Super Heavyweight (+96.4 kg/212 lb) Oriental rules belt in Canberra, Australia on April 4, 2009, but was KO'd inside the first minute of the opening frame.

On August 28, 2010, Cheek lost to Steven Banks via second-round KO in a fight for the WBC Muaythai United States Super Heavyweight (+104.5 kg/230 lb) title. He struggled with the knees of Banks, being floored by them on four occasions throughout the match.

Cheek suffered a one-sided beating at the hands of Cătălin Moroşanu, after re-tearing his MCL in the first round in their SuperKombat World Grand Prix 7 in Varna, Bulgaria bout on July 7, 2012. He was dropped five times, forcing referee Cezar Gheorghe to call a halt to the bout in the second round.

Championships and awards

Kickboxing
K-1
K-1 World Grand Prix 2008 in Hawaii 3rd Place
Holds a record of 3-1 (3 KO's) in the K-1 circuit
International Kickboxing Federation
IKF Amateur California Super Heavyweight (+106.8 kg/235 lbs) Muay Thai Championship
IKF Amateur North American Super Heavyweight (+106.8 kg/235 lbs) International Rules Championship
World Combat Sports Challenge
WCSC World Super Heavyweight Muay Thai Championship
World Kickboxing Association
WKA United States Super Heavyweight (+95 kg/209 lbs) Muay Thai Championship
WKA U.S. Amateur (+91 kg) Muay Thai Championship
WKA U.S. Amateur (+91 kg) Kickboxing Championship

Mixed martial arts
Cage Combat Fighting Championships
CCFC Heavyweight Championship

Boxing
United States Air Force Athletics
United States Air Force and Armed Services heavyweight boxing champion
Golden Gloves
2001 San Antonio Golden Gloves Runner Up (+201 lbs)

Kickboxing record

Legend:

Mixed martial arts record

|-
| Loss
| align=center| 4-4
| Mike Hayes
| TKO (submission to punches)
| PFC: Best of Both Worlds
| 
| align=center| 2
| align=center| 1:01
| Lemoore, California, United States
| 
|-
| Loss
| align=center| 4-3
| Dave Huckaba
| Submission (armbar)
| Gladiator Challenge 87: Collision Course
| 
| align=center| 1
| align=center| 0:37
| Roseville, California, United States
| 
|-
| Loss
| align=center| 4-2
| Buddy Roberts
| Submission (rear naked choke)
| Cage Combat Fighting Championships: Mayhem
| 
| align=center| 1
| align=center| 0:52
| Santa Rosa, California, United States
| 
|-
| Win
| align=center| 4-1
| Richard Blake
| KO (punches)
| Cage Combat Fighting Championships: Annihilation
| 
| align=center| 1
| align=center| 2:05	
| Santa Rosa, California, United States
| Wins the Cage Combat Fighting Championships Heavyweight Championship.
|-
| Loss
| align=center| 3-1
| Chase Gormley
| Submission (keylock)
| Gladiator Challenge 73: High Noon
| 
| align=center| 2
| align=center| 2:20
| Sacramento, California, United States
| 
|-
| Win
| align=center| 3-0
| Thomas Rosser
| TKO (punches)
| Gladiator Challenge 63: Crackdown
| 
| align=center| 1
| align=center| 1:15
| South Lake Tahoe, California, United States
| 
|-
| Win
| align=center| 2-0
| Joe Abouata
| KO (punch)
| Gladiator Challenge 62: Sprawl or Brawl
| 
| align=center| 1
| align=center| 0:31
| Lakeport, California, United States
| 
|-
| Win
| align=center| 1-0
| Dave Huckaba
| TKO (punches)
| Gladiator Challenge 57: Holiday Beatings
| 
| align=center| 2
| align=center| 1:35	
| Sacramento, California, United States
|

External links
 Official K-1 profile
 K-1Sport profile

References

1977 births
Living people
American male kickboxers
Kickboxers from California
Heavyweight kickboxers
American male mixed martial artists
Mixed martial artists from California
Heavyweight mixed martial artists
Mixed martial artists utilizing kickboxing
Mixed martial artists utilizing Muay Thai
Mixed martial artists utilizing boxing
American Muay Thai practitioners
Sportspeople from San Francisco
People from Rohnert Park, California
United States Air Force airmen
American male boxers
Boxers from California
SUPERKOMBAT kickboxers
American military sports players